A top kill is a procedure used as a means of regaining control over an oil well that has been producing or is experiencing well control issues with crude oil or natural gas in the well. It is not a procedure where control has been lost over the well, like a blowout. The process involves pumping heavyweight drilling mud into the well. This procedure is expected to stop the flow of oil and gas from the well. 
A further step could be sealing the well completely, often with cement.

In use
The top kill procedure was used to plug flaming oil wells, blown up by retreating Iraqi forces, in 1991, during the Gulf War.

This technique came to prominence during the 2010 Deepwater Horizon oil spill when it was used in an attempt to seal a seafloor oil well after the failure of the blowout preventer. However, it failed to block the flow of oil.

References

See also
 Well kill
 Blowout preventer

Drilling technology
Oil wells